Carrie is a female given name in English speaking countries, usually a pet form of Caroline or Carolyn. Other spellings include Cari, Kari, Karie, Kerry, Carri, Karri, Kerrie, Kerri, Keri, Cerry, and Karrie, as well as various other spellings. Related names may include Carol, Caroline, Carolyn, Carolyne, or Carolynne.

It is also a surname.

Given name

Carrie Acheson (1934–2023), Irish Fianna Fáil politician
Carrie Akre (born 1966), American musician best known for her work with Seattle underground bands Hammerbox and Goodness
Carrie Ann Inaba (born 1968), American dancer, choreographer, television dance competition judge in Dancing with the Stars, actress, game show host, and singer
Carrie-Anne Moss (born 1967), Canadian actress 
Carrie Barton (born 1976), American synchronized swimmer
Carrie Bebris, American author, journalist and novelist
Carrie Best (1903–2001), Black Canadian journalist and social activist
Carrie Bethel (1898–1974), Native American basket weaver associated with Yosemite National Park
Carrie Jacobs-Bond (1862–1946), American singer, pianist, and songwriter 
Carrie Bowman (1887–1971), American Broadway actress 
Carrie Borzillo (born 1970), American music and entertainment journalist and author 
Carrie Brown (author) (born 1959), American novelist and professor
Carrie Brown (murder victim) (died 1891), murdered New York prostitute, once suggested as a murder victim of Jack the Ripper
Carrie Brownstein (born 1974), American musician, writer, actress, and comedian
Carrie Chapman Catt (1859–1947), American women's suffrage leader who campaigned for the Nineteenth Amendment to the United States Constitution, which gave U.S. women the right to vote in 1920
Carrie Williams Clifford (1862–1934), American author and activist in the women's rights and civil rights movements 
Carrie Coon (born 1981), American actress
Carrie Crowley (born 1964), Irish actress, Gaeilgeoir and former radio and television presenter
Carrie Cunningham (born 1972), American tennis player 
Carrie Cutter (1840–1862), American nurse
Carrie Daniels (basketball), American college basketball coach
Carrie Daumery (1863–1938), Dutch-born American film actress
Carrie Davis (born 1976), British sports TV broadcaster
Carrie Chase Davis (1863–1953), American physician, suffragist
Carrie Delahunt (born 1981), Canadian curler 
Carrie Derick (1862–1941), Canadian botanist and geneticist, the first female professor in a Canadian University, and the founder of McGill University's Genetics Department
Carrie Barefoot Dickerson (1917–2006), American activist who led citizen efforts to stop construction of the proposed Black Fox Nuclear Power Plant in Oklahoma
Carrie Dobro, American actress
Carrie Donovan (1928–2001), American fashion editor
Carrie Englert (born 1957), American gymnastics champion in floor exercise and balance beam and Olympian
Carrie Everson (1842–1914), American metallurgist, inventor and patented processes for extracting metals from ore using the flotation process
Carrie Fisher (1956–2016), American actress, writer, producer, and humorist
Carrie Hope Fletcher (born 1992), English singer, songwriter, actress primarily in musical theatre, author and vlogger
Carrie Genzel (born 1971), Canadian actress, producer and writer
Carrie Graf (born 1967), Australian basketball coach
Carrie Grant (born 1965), British vocal coach, television presenter, and session singer
Carrie Hamilton (1963–2002), American actress, singer, and playwright
Carrie L. Hoyt (1866–1950), American lawyer, politician and the Mayor of Berkeley, California
Carrie Imler, American ballet dancer
Carrie Ingalls (1870–1946), sister of Laura Ingalls Wilder, the writer of Little House books
Carrie Ashton Johnson (1863–1949), American editor, author
Carrie Johnson, British political activist, conservationist, and wife of the former British prime minister Boris Johnson (2019-2022).
Carrie Jones (author), American author in young adult fiction
Carrie Kei Heim (born 1973), American actress, lawyer, and writer
Carrie Keranen, American voice actress, production manager, producer and voice director
Carrie Lam (born 1957), Hong Kong SAR Government administrator and former Chief Executive of Hong Kong (2017-2022).
Carrie Lightbound (born 1979), Canadian sprint kayaker
Carrie Manolakos, American singer-songwriter and actress
Carrie M. McLain (1895–1973), American writer
Carrie Allen McCray (1913–2008), African-American writer 
Carrie Messner (born 1977), American long-distance runner
Carrie Judd Montgomery (1858–1946), American editor, philanthropist, woman preacher, faith healer, evangelist, radical evangelical, and writer
Carrie Morgridge (born 1967), American philanthropist and author
Carrie Nahabedian (born 1958), American chef
Carrie Nation (1846–1911), American woman who was a radical member of the temperance movement, which opposed alcohol before the advent of Prohibition
Carrie Neely (1877/78 –1938), American tennis player 
Carrie Newcomer, American singer, songwriter and author
Carrie Ng (born 1963), Hong Kong actress
Carrie Nye (1936–2006), American stage and film actress
Carrie Marcus Neiman (1883–1953), American businessperson and one of the cofounders of Neiman Marcus, a luxury department store
Carrie Oeding (born 1978), American poet
Carrie Olver (born 1967), Canadian TV personality
Carrie Prejean (born 1987), American beauty pageant and model
Carrie Preston (born 1967), American actress, producer and director
Carrie Pringle (1859–1930), Austrian-born British soprano singer
Carrie Quigley (born 1970), Australian sport shooter
Carrie Quinlan, British actress, comedy writer and journalist
Carrie Rickey (born 1952), American feminist, art and film critic
Carrie Rodriguez (born 1978), American singer-songwriter 
Carrie Russell (born 1990), Jamaican sprinter
Carrie Ruud (born 1952), American politician and member of the Minnesota Senate
Carrie Babcock Sherman (1856–1931), wife of U.S. Vice President James S. Sherman
Carrie Savage (born 1980), or Carrie Daniels, American theatre, film, and TV actress, who is mostly known for her work as a voice actress
Carrie Scott, American curator, director and art writer
Carrie Sheinberg (born 1972), American alpine skier
Carrie M. Shoaff (1849–1939), American artist, author, potter, playwright, correspondent
Carrie Smith (1925–2012), American blues and jazz singer
Carrie Smith (sailor) (born 1995), Australian sportswoman and competitive sailor
Carrie Snodgress (1945–2004), American actress
Carrie Snow, American stand-up comedian, television comic writer 
Carrie Steinseifer (born 1968), American swimmer and Olympian
Carrie Stevens (born 1969), American model, actress, and entrepreneur 
Carrie G. Stevens (1882-1970), American fly fisher and fly lure tier
Carrie Tollefson (born 1977), American middle-distance runner 
Carrie Turner (actress) (1863-1897), American stage actress
Carrie Underwood (born 1983), American country music singer, songwriter and actress
Carrie Clark Ward (1862–1926), American actress of the silent era
Carrie Weaver, American author of contemporary romance novels
Carrie Mae Weems (born 1953), American photographer and artist who works with text, fabric, audio, digital images, and installation video
Carrie Worthley (born 1983), Australian netball player

Surname
Alex Carrie, Scottish footballer 
Colin Carrie (born 1962), Canadian politician and Member of Parliament
T. J. Carrie (born 1990), American National Football League player

Fictional characters

Carrie, a character in the animated series The Ridonculous Race
Carrie Black (OITNB), a recurring character in Orange Is the New Black
Carrie Bradshaw, a lead character of the HBO romantic sitcom Sex and the City, as well as the CW series The Carrie Diaries
Carrie Brady, on the NBC soap opera, Days of Our Lives
Carrie Heffernan, on the American sitcom The King of Queens
Carrie Kelley, in Frank Miller's graphic novels Batman: The Dark Knight Returns and its sequel Batman: The Dark Knight Strikes Again
Carrie Krueger, a character on The Amazing World of Gumball 
Carrie Mark, a key character in the web series Petscop
Carrie Mathison, protagonist of the American political TV shows Homeland
Carrie Murtaugh, a character in the 1987 American buddy cop action movie Lethal Weapon
Carrie Nicholls, in the ITV soap opera Emmerdale
Carrie Owen, in the Channel 4 soap opera Hollyoaks
Carrie Sharples, in the television series Alice
Carrie White, title character and protagonist of Stephen King's novel Carrie
Carrie Wilson, a character from Netflix's Julie and the Phantoms

See also

Carlie
Carree (name)
Carrie (disambiguation)
Carey (disambiguation)
Carry (disambiguation)
Cary (disambiguation)
Carie Graves
Karrie

Feminine given names
Hypocorisms